Bermuda competed in the 2011 Parapan American Games.

Competitors
The following table lists Bermuda's delegation per sport and gender.

Athletics

Women's track

References

Nations at the 2011 Parapan American Games
2011 in Bermudian sport
Bermuda at the Pan American Games